Tuscaloosa City Schools is a public school district headquartered in Tuscaloosa, Alabama, United States. The district's boundaries include almost all of the city limits of Tuscaloosa.

There are approximately 10,000 students enrolled in Tuscaloosa City Schools.
The Tuscaloosa City Schools provides instruction to more than 10,000 Pre-Kindergarten through 12th grade students throughout metropolitan Tuscaloosa, Alabama. Twenty-three schools comprise the district, including 12 elementary schools, 5 middle schools, 3 high schools, and 3 campuses dedicated to specialty education: one for students with special needs and those receiving alternative education, a school for students studying performing arts, and a career technical facility for grades 9 – 12.

History

In 1884 the municipal government established the district, which had 247 white students and 173 black students in its first year. The schools remained segregated racially after Brown v. Board of Education. In 1969 the district had 13,500 students. In 1975 the NAACP Legal Defense Fund and the U.S. Department of Justice started an effort to make Tuscaloosa schools racially integrated. In 1979 a desegregation agreement was instituted by a federal judge requiring the district to have a single high school, Central High School when it previously had two (Tuscaloosa High School for white students and Druid High School for black students); the agreement also meant the district reorganized the middle school system to have three middle schools.

White students made up the majority of the district's students around 1979. White flight began to occur towards Tuscaloosa County Schools and majority-white private schools so that in 1994 white students made up less than 33% of the total students. The district had 10,300 students in 1995. Around the late 1980s/early 1990s Saturn chose not to locate a plant in Tuscaloosa because of the performance of the public schools, and by 1993 the city leadership wanted Mercedes-Benz to build a plant there. Influential politicians and influential people privately wished to create some majority-white schools fearing that the remaining white population would otherwise leave. The leaders made public statements that they wished to remove the desegregation order since it required the school system to get approval from the court for repairs and because not having neighborhood schools reduced its prestige.

The district proposed establishing a new elementary school in the majority-white Rock Quarry area in 1993, and the court granted this action in 1995; the district did this to check if the federal court system, which was becoming increasingly conservative, would be pliable to lifting the court order. With the new school established, the district then asked for the entire desegregation order to be removed. To convince black leaders to appear at the federal hearings so they could give support to ending the desegregation order, white leaders suggested  a quid pro quo of building new schools in black areas.

Judge Sharon Blackburn released the district from its desegregation agreement in 1998. The district board voted to reorganize the middle schools into four in 1999. In August 2000 they voted to establish two new high schools and carve out three attendance zones, and Central High had a much smaller attendance zone serving a majority black student body, while the other two schools, had whiter student bodies. The performance of Central High School drastically declined after the change.

In 2007 district officials felt alarmed as 22% of the total number of students were white, and a hotly-debated proposal to require more students to return to attendance zones was raised. After the association of the University of Alabama-area historic district asked the board members to consider assigning its area to majority-white schools, even though majority-black schools were closer, the board granted their request one day later, on May 3, 2007, when it voted 5–3 to establish the plan, with the three no votes being two black board members and Virginia Powell, a white board member who held the seat of the district including the university area.

Paul McKendrick became superintendent in 2011.

Schools

High schools
Central High School
Northridge High School
Paul W. Bryant High School

Former:
 Druid High School (for black students)
 Tuscaloosa High School (for white students)

Middle schools
Eastwood Middle School 
Northridge Middle School
The Alberta School of Performing Arts (PreK-8)
Tuscaloosa Magnet Schools—Middle 
Westlawn Middle School

Elementary schools
Arcadia Elementary School
Central Elementary School
Martin Luther King Jr. Elementary School
Oakdale Elementary School
Rock Quarry Elementary School
Tuscaloosa district officials proposed establishing the school and asking federal officials to allow them to do so, in 1993, as a way of seeing if the federal courts were pliable to lifting the whole desegregation order. Judge Blackburn accepted the formation of the school in 1995. Tuscaloosa officials at the time stated about half of the students would be white and the other half would be black. Initially, its student body was 24% black, and by 2014 it was 9% black. It was one of the schools in the district with the highest student performance metrics.
Skyland Elementary School
Southview Elementary School
Tuscaloosa Magnet Schools—Elementary
University Place Elementary School
Verner Elementary School
Woodland Forrest Elementary School

Other campuses
New Heights Community Resource Center
The Alberta School of Performing Arts
Tuscaloosa Career & Technology Academy

Failing schools
Statewide testing ranks the schools in Alabama. Those in the bottom six percent are listed as "failing." As of early 2018, both Paul W. Bryant High School and Central High School were included in this category. But, in the 2018–2019 school year, Central High School was removed from the failing school list.

See also
List of school districts in Alabama

References

External links
 

School districts in Alabama
Education in Tuscaloosa, Alabama
1884 establishments in Alabama
School districts established in 1884